Robert Tate (born October 19, 1973) is a retired American football cornerback and return specialist. Tate played nine seasons of professional football in the National Football League with the Minnesota Vikings, Baltimore Ravens and the Arizona Cardinals. Tate played in college for the University of Cincinnati. Originally a wide receiver, he was converted to defensive back upon entering the NFL. Tate played at Cincinnati with notable NFL players Artrell Hawkins, Sam Garnes and Jason Fabini.

American football cornerbacks
American football return specialists
Cincinnati Bearcats football players
Minnesota Vikings players
Baltimore Ravens players
Arizona Cardinals players
1973 births
Living people
Players of American football from Harrisburg, Pennsylvania